John Newcombe was the defending champion but did not compete that year.

Arthur Ashe won in the final 3–6, 6–4, 6–4, 6–0 against Björn Borg.

Seeds
A champion seed is indicated in bold text while text in italics indicates the round in which that seed was eliminated.

  Arthur Ashe (champion)
  Harold Solomon (quarterfinals)
  Björn Borg (final)
  Roscoe Tanner (quarterfinals)
  John Alexander (semifinals)
  Raúl Ramirez (quarterfinals)
  Rod Laver (semifinals)
  Mark Cox (quarterfinals)

Draw

External links
1975 World Championship Tennis Finals Draw

Singles